Vissannapeta is a village in NTR district of the Indian state of Andhra Pradesh.

Economy 
Agriculture is the main occupation. The Mango orchards are in abundant with Banginapalli, Totapuri and other varieties. Mangos are exported to  Dubai, Hongkong, London and Singapore.

Educational Institutions 
The village is surrounded by good educational institutions. St. Theresa’s English Medium School and Sri Siddhartha Public School are located at both ends of the village.
In between the both Schools like Zilla Parishad High School, Vikas and Chaitanya Schools.

Vissannapeta has the education from KG to PG.

People comes from different villages everyday to study in Vissannapeta.

Vissannapeta is famous for mangoes as well.

See also 
Villages in Vissannapeta mandal

References 

Villages in Krishna district
Mandal headquarters in Krishna district